Savoy is a musical group from Boulder, now living in Brooklyn, consisting of producer Gray Smith, guitarist Ben Eberdt, and drummer Mike Kelly.

Biography
Savoy's musical style fuses the classic sound of rock 'n' roll with techno, dance, and bass music, a genre they've championed known as ERM (Electronic Rock Music). Savoy's performances feature live instrumentation (drums and guitar), extensive lighting and laser production, as well as vocals from grammy nominated artist Heather Bright, Chali 2na, and more.

Since 2009, Savoy has released 2 full-length albums and 3 EPs including their 2014, 15 track release, "Self Predator", and their latest 2015 EP, "1000 Years" (Monstercat), which reached #3 on the iTunes Dance Chart.

Savoy has performed at festivals such as Lollapalooza, Wakarusa, X Games, Voodoo Experience, Spring Awakening, Electric Daisy Carnival, Ultra Music Festival, Mysteryland, and more. The group has also headlined Red Rocks Amphitheatre in 2012 and 2015 and embarked on 5 headlining US tours.

Discography

Albums

 Automatic (2009)
 Supertrail (2012)
 Three Against Nature (2013)
 Self Predator (2014)
 1000 Years - Monstercat (2015)

Singles 

 "DIY" – Manufactured Music (2012)
 "Leaving You" (with Sound Remedy featuring Jojee) – Monstercat (2015)
 "Neon Nebraska" (feat. Porsches) - Self-released (2016)
 "Contemplate" (with Grabbitz) - Monstercat (2017)
 "How U Like Me Now" (feat. Roniit) - Monstercat (2017)
 "Up All Night" (feat. Laura Reed) - Self-released (2017)
 "Don't Quit Me Now" - Self-released (2018)
 "Let You Go" - Monstercat (2018)

References

External links
Official site

American electronic rock musical groups
Monstercat artists
Dubstep music groups
Electronic music groups from Colorado
Electronic music groups from New York (state)